Robert Leslie Barnes (March 8, 1913 – November 12, 1970) was an American comic strip artist most notable for his marriage-themed gag panel The Better Half.

Barnes' first syndicated panel was Laugh of the Week / Laff of the Week from 1947 to 1951 succeeded by Double-Take from 1952 to 1957. Barnes launched The Better Half with the Register and Tribune Syndicate in 1956, doing the strip until his death from cancer on November 12, 1970. A few strips appeared after his death, continuing until 1971.

He received the National Cartoonists Society Newspaper Panel Cartoon Award for The Better Half in 1958.

Personal life 
His wife, Ruth, collaborated with him on his work, and took over writing The Better Half upon his demise.

References

Sources 
Strickler, Dave. Syndicated Comic Strips and Artists, 1924–1995: The Complete Index. Cambria, CA: Comics Access, 1995. .

External links 
Billy Ireland Cartoon Library & Museum Art Database

1913 births
1970 deaths
American comic strip cartoonists
Artists from Portland, Oregon
Deaths from cancer in California